Pervomaysky Administrative Okrug is a territorial division of the City of Murmansk in Murmansk Oblast, Russia. Population: 

It was established on February 21, 1975 as Pervomaysky City District when its territory was split from Oktyabrsky City District. When the Charter of the Hero City of Murmansk was adopted on December 17, 1995, all city districts started to be referred to as administrative okrugs.

References

Notes

Sources

Murmansk
States and territories established in 1975